Route 187 is a short segment of highway running less than five miles (8 km) in Howard County, Missouri.  Its eastern terminus is at Route 87 south of Glasgow; its western terminus is at Boone's Lick State Historic Site.  No towns are on the route.

Route description
Route 187 begins at Boone's Lick State Historic Site in Howard County, where the road continues west as CR-328. The route heads northeast on a two-lane undivided road, passing through areas of fields and woods. Route 187 curves east and comes to its eastern terminus at Route 87 north of Boonesboro.

Major intersections

References

187
Transportation in Howard County, Missouri